Osgood Robert "Oz" Perkins II (born February 2, 1974) is an American actor, screenwriter, and director.

Early life
Perkins was born in Manhattan, New York, the elder son of actor Anthony Perkins (April 4, 1932 – September 12, 1992) and photographer and actress Berry Berenson (April 14, 1948 – September 11, 2001). He is the brother of musician Elvis Perkins, a grandson of the stage actor Osgood Perkins, a nephew of the actress Marisa Berenson, and a great-grandson of the fashion designer Elsa Schiaparelli, who was a great-niece of Giovanni Schiaparelli, the Italian astronomer. His maternal grandfather was of Lithuanian-Jewish descent, and his family's original surname was "Valvrojenski".

Career
Perkins' first acting role was in Psycho II (1983), in which he briefly appeared as the twelve-year-old version of the Norman Bates character his father portrayed. Since then, he has appeared in the films Six Degrees of Separation (1993), Legally Blonde (2001) as "Dorky David," Not Another Teen Movie (also 2001) and Secretary (2002), and in episodes of Alias and other television shows. He also has a brief role in the film Star Trek (2009) as a Starfleet Academy trainee. In the award winning indie film La Cucina (2007), he plays Chris, opposite Leisha Hailey.

He wrote and directed the horror films The Blackcoat's Daughter (2015) and I Am the Pretty Thing That Lives in the House (2016), and directed the dark fantasy-horror adaptation Gretel & Hansel (2020). He also appeared as one of numerous commentators in the second episode of the Shudder documentary mini-series Queer for Fear: The History of Queer Horror (2022), primarily discussing implications of his father's role as Norman Bates in Psycho and its sequels.

Personal life
He was married to his wife Sidney from 1999 to July 2016. They have two children: a son (born 2004) and a daughter (born 2008).

Filmography
Credited as Oz Perkins
 Removal (2010) (as writer)

Credited as Osgood Perkins

Acting roles
Film

Television

References

External links

Icons of Fright interview

1974 births
Living people
20th-century American male actors
21st-century American male actors
American people of Egyptian descent
American people of English descent
American people of French descent
American people of Italian descent
American people of Lithuanian-Jewish descent
American people of Swiss descent
American male film actors
Male actors from New York City